Heliolonche is a genus of moths of the family Noctuidae.

Species
 Heliolonche carolus McDunnough, 1936
 Heliolonche celeris (Grote, 1873)
 Heliolonche joaquinensis Hardwick, 1996
 Heliolonche modicella Grote, 1873
 Heliolonche pictipennis (Grote, 1875)

References
Natural History Museum Lepidoptera genus database
Heliolonche at funet

Heliothinae